The nine governorates of Lebanon are subdivided into 25 districts (Aqdya, singularqadaa). Beirut Governorate is not subdivided into districts, and Akkar Governorate comprises a single district.

The districts are further divided into municipalities.

List of districts

Capitals (مراكز) of the governorates and districts are indicated in parentheses.

Akkar Governorate (Halba)
Akkar (Halba)
Baalbek-Hermel Governorate (Baalbek)
Baalbek (Baalbek)
Hermel (Hermel)
Beirut Governorate (Beirut)
Beqaa Governorate (Zahlé)
Rashaya (Rashaya)
Western Beqaa (Joub Jannine - winter Saghbine - summer)
Zahle (Zahlé)
Keserwan-Jbeil Governorate (Jounieh)
Byblos (Byblos)
Keserwan (Jounieh)
Mount Lebanon Governorate (Baabda)
Aley (Aley)
Baabda (Baabda)
Chouf (Beiteddine)
Matn/Metn (Jdeideh)
Nabatieh Governorate (Nabatieh)
Bint Jbeil (Bint Jbeil)
Hasbaya (Hasbaya)
Marjeyoun (Marjeyoun)
Nabatieh (Nabatieh)
North Governorate (Tripoli)
Batroun (Batroun)
Bsharri (Bsharri)
Koura (Amioun)
Miniyeh-Danniyeh District (Miniyeh)
Tripoli (Tripoli)
Zgharta (Zgharta)
South Governorate (Sidon)
Sidon (Sidon)
Jezzine (Jezzine)
Tyre (Tyre)

References

 
Subdivisions of Lebanon
Districts
Lebanon 2
Districts, Lebanon